The 4th constituency of Maine-et-Loire (French: Quatrième circonscription de Maine-et-Loire) is a French legislative constituency in the Maine-et-Loire département. Like the other 576 French constituencies, it elects one MP using a two round electoral system.

Description
The 4th Constituency of Maine-et-Loire is situated in the south east of the department. It includes the south of Saumur a town famed for its wine production, the northern half of the town is contained within Maine-et-Loire's 3rd constituency.

Politically the seat has historically favoured centre right candidates. It did, however, elect a Green Party deputy in 1997 and along with the majority of seats in Maine-et-Loire opt for En Marche! in 2017.

Assembly members

Election results

2022

 
 
 
 
 
 
 
|-
| colspan="8" bgcolor="#E9E9E9"|
|-

2017

 
 
 
 
 
 
 
 
 
|-
| colspan="8" bgcolor="#E9E9E9"|
|-

2012

 
 
 
 
 
|-
| colspan="8" bgcolor="#E9E9E9"|
|-

References

4